Acrobelesia is a monotypic genus of brachiopods belonging to the family Dyscoliidae. The only species is Acrobelesia cooperi.

The species is found in Europe.

References

Terebratulida
Brachiopod genera
Monotypic brachiopod genera